Vito Joseph Picone (born March 20, 1941) is the lead singer of The Elegants, and along with Jimmy Mochella is a remaining original member.  He has also played bit parts in Goodfellas, Analyze This, and The Sopranos.

During the 1990s, he managed Reparata and the Delrons. For the past twenty two years he has hosted Let the Good Times Roll on Staten Island Cable, a nostalgia talk/variety music show.

Personal Life
Picone was born in and has lived most of his life in South Beach, Staten Island, New York.

Filmography 
Goodfellas (1990) - Himself
The Sopranos (1999, TV Series) - Himself
The Irishman- Himself/Vila d'Roma manager

References

External links 
 http://www.theelegants.net

Living people
1941 births
American male singers
American television talk show hosts
American people of Italian descent
People from Staten Island
Singers from New York City